Iida Chōko (飯田 蝶子) (April 15, 1897 – December 26, 1972) was a Japanese actress. Her real name was Shigehara Tefu. She played working class women and grandmothers, and appeared in more than 300 films. Her husband was cameraman .

Biography

Early life 
Iida was born on April 15, 1897 in what is now Asakusa, Tokyo. Though her father was a minor official with the Ministry of Communications, the family didn't have much money, so Iida was sent to live with her maternal grandmother at 2 years old. Iida was the oldest of 5 children, but because of their poverty the children became malnourished and developed nyctalopia. After studying at a private elementary school, Iida entered the Ueno Koto Jogakko with her grandmother's help, and worked at an outdoor exhibition at night to help with the family's finances. She eventually found that she enjoyed working more than school. She stopped attending school for two months until the seasonal exhibition closed in autumn.

Career as an actress 
In 1913 Iida began working at the Matsuzakaya in Ueno. She worked in several positions there, including in the sewing department and as a clerk. In 1919, Iida began writing for an entertainment newspaper company in Nihonbashi. That autumn, a kabuki actor, put out an ad in the Miyako Shinbun for an actress to perform for a theater called the Asakusa Koen Gekijo. They hired Iida, but she found that all of her roles were of handmaidens. When the theater director died in 1920, the theater was dissolved. Iida applied to work at film studios, but was rejected.

Entering Shochiku Kamata 
They originally hired only Iida's friend, but one of Iida's colleagues who worked at Shochiku stepped in and encouraged them to hire her for supporting roles, like maids.

In January 1923, Iida officially entered the company. She debuted in the film Shi ni iku tsuma. Her first film that made her famous was Yami o iku, in which she was praised by director Yoshinobu Ikeda for playing a sexually unappealing laborer. Iida then received good reviews and a bonus for her role as an elderly woman in Kiyohiko Ushihara's Jinsei no Ai. She briefly moved to another film studio after the 1923 Great Kanto Earthquake, but soon returned to the Kamata studio in January 1924.

Shochiku 
In 1924, while playing a female factory worker in Ikeda's Sweet Home, Iida cut her lip on an apple crate during a scene in which she attacks Moroguchi Tsuzuya. She needed two stitches, and resolved to refine her acting skills. In July of that year, Iida was asked to act in more comedies, like 's "Gamaguchi". Iida married Hideo Shigehara, a camera operator, in 1927. Shigehara worked often with Yasujirō Ozu, and Iida played supporting roles in many of his films, such as Days of Youth and Tokyo Chorus. As the film world moved from silent movies to "talkies", Iida began studying rakugo. Her first sound film was Chushingura in 1932. She later became known for her expressive acting style in Ozu's A Story of Floating Weeds.

Post-war and death 
Iida's first film after the war ended in 1945 was Heinosuke Gosho's Izu no Musumetachi. This film was also Iida's last film with Shochiku, and she left them to become a freelancer. Her first post-war film with Yasujirō Ozu was Record of a Tenement Gentleman, in 1947. She also appeared in Akira Kurosawa's Drunken Angel and Stray Dog, Hiroshi Inagaki's Rickshaw Man, and 's . She also played the main character's grandmother in Toho's Wakadaisho series. She also appeared in many television dramas. She was awarded a Medal of Honor in 1963, and an Order of the Sacred Treasure in 1967. In the same year, her husband died.

While filming a television drama on July 26, 1972, Iida's health suddenly worsened. She was taken to the hospital the next day, where she was diagnosed with pleurisy. She died of lung cancer on December 26, 1972.

Filmography

References

External links 
 

1972 deaths
1897 births
Actresses from Tokyo
Recipients of the Order of the Sacred Treasure, 4th class
Recipients of the Medal with Purple Ribbon
Japanese silent film actresses
Japanese film actresses